Frankie Jo Abernathy (December 21, 1981 – June 9, 2007)  was an American purse designer and reality television personality, known for her time as a cast member on MTV's The Real World: San Diego which was filmed in late 2003 and aired from January to June 2004.  Hailing from Kansas City, Abernathy was the elder daughter of Abbie Hunter and Joe Abernathy.  She had a younger sister named Mamie, and a stepfather, Perry Hunter.  She attended Blue Springs High School in Blue Springs, Missouri.

The Real World: San Diego
MTV's promotional materials described Abernathy as someone who "likes to shock people with her appearance, date bad boys, party all night and dreams of being an artist." She was known for her taste in punk rock music and her fondness for Hello Kitty.

The first housemate Abernathy greeted was Jacquese Smith, with whom she first entered the Real World house and with whom MTV believes she may have been the closest during their stay there.

Abernathy had cystic fibrosis, which she was diagnosed with at the age of three.  During her time on The Real World, she showed many symptoms of the genetic disorder, such as difficulty breathing and immune-system impairment. Her disease was a significant part of her storyline on the show.  Of those living with cystic fibrosis, fewer than 50% live to the age of 37.  One of Abernathy's sayings was "Tomorrow is a privilege, so live today like tomorrow isn't happening."

Abernathy left the show before the end of the season due to conflict with her roommates and the strain of separation from her boyfriend.

After The Real World
After leaving the show in early 2004, Abernathy spent her time working at numerous retail outlets in Kansas City, working tattoo conventions with the Art Intensity Network, getting more tattoos, and spending time with her loved ones. She also appeared on the cover of the May 2005 issue of Prick, a tattoo magazine.

Abernathy moved to Shorewood, Wisconsin with her family in late 2006. She began designing purses forged from old vinyl records. According to her mother, winter is a difficult time for people with the chronic lung disease, and the winter of 2006 was particularly problematic for Abernathy. Her illness had been worse than in prior winters and the family considered trying to get Abernathy qualified to appear on a lung transplant list.

Abernathy died June 9, 2007, in Shorewood, Wisconsin, from complications of cystic fibrosis. She was 25 years old. She was the second alumnus of The Real World to die, after Pedro Zamora. As with Zamora's struggle with AIDS, Abernathy is credited by MTV.com with helping to raise national awareness of cystic fibrosis and putting a face on the disease.  Abernathy's housemate Jacquese Smith, with whom she was the closest, was particularly devastated by her death and by having not kept in touch with her, as was fellow housemate Jamie Chung. Abernathy's mother, Abbie Hunter, said about her time on the show:

A scholarship was set up in her name at her alma mater, Blue Springs High School.

References

1981 births
2007 deaths
People from Kansas City, Missouri
Deaths from cystic fibrosis
People from Shorewood, Wisconsin
The Real World (TV series) cast members